Punjab Land Development Company is responsible to construct and maintain affordable housing schemes in Punjab, Pakistan. This company is fully owned by the Government of Punjab, Pakistan.

History
Lahore Development Authority proposed Public Private Partnership (PPP) model where a certain Government land parcel is divided in two halves. One half for 'Affordable Housing' and the other half for 'Commercial Housing Society'. 'Private Partner'  builds the 'Affordable Housing' units at its own expense and gets the land allocated for Commercial Housing Society. Then the 'Private Partner' sells residential and commercial land plots at market rates within the Commercial Housing Society and makes handsome returns for its 'Private Partner' unit. This provides affordable housing units below market value to deserving citizens of Punjab, Pakistan without involving financial funding from the government.

Top housing developers of Pakistan were invited at the Chief Minister Punjab's office and were given briefing on the innovative 'Public Private Partnership' mode.

Management of public private partnership unit
Founder: Shehbaz Sharif, Chief Minister of Punjab, Pakistan
CEO: Mr. Moazzam Iqbal Sipra
Chief Engineer: Colonel (Retired) Arif Majeed Butt
General Manager: Mr. Imtiaz Ahmed Chaudhry

References

Pakistani companies established in 2010
Companies based in Lahore
Government agencies of Punjab, Pakistan
Affordable housing advocacy organizations
Government-owned companies of Pakistan